Mbarara Regional Cancer Centre (MRCC) is a public, specialized, tertiary care medical facility owned by the Uganda Ministry of Health. The facility is located along the Mbarara-Kabale Road, in the central business district of the city of Mbarara, on the campus of Mbarara Regional Referral Hospital. The coordinates of the centre are: 0°37'03.0"S, 30°39'17.0"E (Latitude:0.617500S, Longitude:30.654720E).

Overview
MRCC is a cancer treatment, research, and teaching center, affiliated with the Mbarara University School of Medicine and with the Mbarara Regional Referral Hospital, the teaching hospital for the medical school. MRCC was founded in 2017, by Professor Frederick Kayanja and Professor Tony Wilson.

The establishment of the centre was informed by the increased patient burden at Uganda Cancer Institute, where 4,500 to 6,000 new patients are registered annually. MRCC was registering about 3,000 new patients annually (approximately 9 patients daily), as of March 2018. Other regional cancer centers established in this effort include Arua Regional Cancer Centre, Gulu Regional Cancer Centre and Mbale Regional Cancer Centre. As of March 2018, the MRCC is hosted on one of the wards of Mbarara Hospital.

In 2017, the government of Uganda borrowed €100 million (USh390 billion at that time), from the government of Austria to construct a brand new cancer center. The , where the new centre is going to be built, was donated by Mbarara University of Science and Technology.

As of February 2019, Mbarara Cancer Centre cared for a cohort of cancer patients that exceeded 20,000 in number.

Collaboration
The cancer centre works in collaboration with Uganda Cancer Institute, the leading cancer treatment and research institute in Uganda, which is under transformation into the East African Cancer Centre of Excellence.

See also
 Hospitals in Uganda

References

External links

Medical research institutes in Uganda
Mbarara
2017 establishments in Uganda
Hospitals in Uganda
Cancer organisations based in Uganda